Bernardo Añor may refer to:

Bernardo Añor (footballer, born 1959) (born 1959), Venezuelan footballer
Bernardo Añor (footballer, born 1988) (born 1988), Venezuelan footballer